Fernando Jara Aninat (born 9 August 1930) is a Chilean footballer.  He competed in the men's tournament at the 1952 Summer Olympics.

References

External links
 
 

1930 births
Living people
Chilean footballers
Chile international footballers
Olympic footballers of Chile
Footballers at the 1952 Summer Olympics
Place of birth missing (living people)
Association football midfielders
Club Deportivo Universidad Católica footballers